The 2005 Women's Lacrosse World Cup was the seventh Women's Lacrosse World Cup and was played in Annapolis, Maryland from 23 June – 2 July, 2005. Australia defeated the United States in the final to win the tournament.

Results

Group A

Table

Group B

Table

Classification Play Offs (June 28)
Canada v Scotland 17-7
United States v Czech Republic 20-1
Australia v New Zealand 22-0
England v Germany 22-0
Japan v Wales 12-8

Knockout Play Offs (June 29)
Czech Republic v Germany 4-2
Scotland v New Zealand 18-4

Quarter-finals (June 30)
Canada v Japan 13-11
United States v Scotland 23-0
Australia v Czech Republic 26-2
England v Wales 6-5

Semi-finals (Jul 1)
Australia v Canada 22-7
United States v England 13-3

Fifth Place (Jul 2)
Japan v Wales 12-8

Third Place (Jul 2)
England v Canada 11-8

Final (Jul 2)
Australia v United States 14-7

References

2009 Women's
2005 in lacrosse
International lacrosse competitions hosted by the United States
Lacrosse World Cup
Women's lacrosse in the United States